Willow Green may refer to:

 Willow Green, Cheshire, a location in England
 Willow Green, Worcestershire, a location in England
 Willow Green, a homestead in Western Australia
 Willow Green, a fictional character on the television series Ice

See also
 Willows Green, a hamlet in Essex, England